Sandlot Heroes was a talented American pop rock band from Bethlehem, Pennsylvania. The band's singles Out of My Hands and Believer were played regionally on Top 40 radio, an unusual achievement for an unsigned band.

History

The band self-released their first album, Pretend That We're Famous, on October 31, 2009. On April 15, 2012 the band released a five song EP titled The Trace EP. On most of their recordings, the band has worked with producer Adam Richman in Coney Island, New York.

In 2011, the band was featured on MTV Buzzworthy.

Subsequently, the band has toured with Action Item in January 2011, Honor Society in November/December 2011, Hawthorne Heights in April 2012,  Bowling For Soup in April/May 2012, Hollywood Ending in August 2012,
and Yellowcard, We Are the In Crowd, and The Wonder Years in November/December 2012.

The band has also opened for many notable acts, including:

 Carly Rae Jepsen
 Jason Derulo
 All Time Low
 Boys Like Girls
 Gym Class Heroes
 Saosin
 Talib Kweli
 Jesse McCartney
 The Ready Set
 Matt and Kim
 Iyaz
 Hot Chelle Rae
 Motion City Soundtrack
 Shontelle
 The Red Jumpsuit Apparatus
 Armor For Sleep
 Sugarcult

Discography

Albums
Pretend That We're Famous (2009)
Track Listing:
1. The Trainwreck
2. Someone Special
3. History
4. Out of My Hands
5. The Illusion
6. By The Morning
7. So
8. Something Is Missing
9. Alone Anymore
10. Believer

EPs
The Trace [EP] (2012)
Track Listing:
1. Paradise
2. Out of My Hands (2012)
3. My Favorite Song
4. Freeway
5. All In All

Band members 
Dan Kastelnik - Lead Vocals, Guitar
Chris Morrison - Guitar/ Vocals
Ans Gibson - Drums
Jake Lare - Bass/Vocals

Music videos 
 Believer (2010)
 Freeway (2011)
 All In All (2012)

References

Rock music groups from Pennsylvania
American pop rock music groups